This is a partial list of archeological sites in Korea, including both North and South Korea.

 Acha Mountain Fortress, in Gwangjin-gu, Seoul, South Korea
 Anak Tomb No.3, in Anak, South Hwanghae, North Korea
 Anapji, in Gyeongju, South Korea
 Bangudae Petroglyphs, in Ulsan, South Korea
 Banwolseong, in Gyeongju, South Korea
 Daepyeong, in Jinju, South Korea
 Gangjingun Kiln Sites, in Gangjin, South Korea
 Goguryeo tombs, in Nampho and Pyongyang, North Korea
 Gold Crown Tomb, in Gyeongju, South Korea
 Gyeongju Historic Areas, in Gyeongju, South Korea
 Heavenly Horse Tomb, in Gyeongju, South Korea
 Hwangnyongsa, in Gyeongju, South Korea
 Igeum-dong site, in Sacheon, South Korea
 Jeongok-ri site, in Yeoncheon, South Korea
 Komun Moru, in Sangwon County, Pyongyang, North Korea
 Mireuksa, in Iksan, South Korea
 Nakrang tombs, in the vicinity of Pyongyang, North Korea
 Poseokjeong, in Gyeongju, South Korea 
 Pungnap Toseong (Pungnap Earthen Fortress), in Songpa-gu, Seoul, South Korea
 Songgung-ni, in Buyeo-gun, Chungcheong Nam-do, South Korea
 Tomb of King Muryeong, in Buyeo, South Korea

See also 
 List of archaeological sites sorted by country

Archeology
Korea